The national colours of Australia are green and gold. They were established by the Governor-General of Australia, Sir Ninian Stephen, on 19 April 1984 in the Commonwealth of Australia Gazette; on advice from Prime Minister Bob Hawke.

The gold colour represents the golden wattle (Acacia pycnantha), which is Australia's national flower. The uniforms of Australia's national sports teams are usually green and gold. The golden wattle flower, and the colours green and gold, are also featured on the Coat of arms of Australia.

The Australian government states that, to be used correctly, the colours are placed side-by-side, with no other colour between them. The exact green and gold colours are specified as Pantone Matching System numbers 348C and 116C. The colours are always referred to as 'green and gold'.

Other colour combinations have been used to represent Australia:

 blue (NSW) and maroon (Qld) together have been used by the Australia National Rugby League Team from 1908-1928 and again on commemorative jerseys, and by the Australia National Rugby Union Team from 1899-1929. 
 red, white and blue, and
 blue and gold.

According to the Australian government, "green and gold have been popularly embraced as Australia’s national sporting colours" since the late 1800s. Nearly every current Australian national sports team wears them (although the hues and proportions of the colours may vary between teams and across eras). Australia's cricket team first wore the colours in 1899, in the form of the baggy green, the cap presented to Australian cricket players.

History
The first Australian national sporting team to wear green and gold was the Australian cricket team that toured England in 1899. Their clothes were the traditional white, but the captain Joe Darling arranged for green and gold caps and blazers to be worn for the opening match of the Ashes series. Previously, the team had had no uniform cap or blazer colours but wore an assortment of club or state colours. The Australian cricket team continued to use the colours thereafter, and in 1908 the colours were ratified as the official team colours for future Australian cricket teams. During subsequent discussions by members of the New South Wales Cricket Association, the colours were reportedly referred to as "gum-tree green" and "wattle-gold". Australian national colours have switched between green and blue often throughout history causing some Australians to confuse the two.

The Australasian Olympic team adopted "green and wattle" in 1908, but not every team played in the colours. In the 1912 Olympics, an official Australian uniform was adopted for the first time: green vests with gold trimming, and white shorts with green and gold trimming.

Of the football codes, the Australian national soccer team first wore green and gold in 1924 with the Australian national rugby league team and Australia national rugby union team following in 1928 and 1929 respectively.

Uses

Sports teams

Teams that wear the green and gold include:
 the Australia cricket team (one day cricket and Twenty20 cricket);
 the Australian Summer Olympics team;
 the Wallabies (rugby union);
 the Kangaroos (rugby league);
 the Jillaroos (rugby league);
 the Wallaroos (rugby union);
 the Diamonds (netball);
 the Socceroos (men's association football (soccer));
 the Matildas (women's association football (soccer));
 the Boomers (men's basketball);
 the Opals (women's basketball);
 the Kookaburras (men's field hockey);
 the Hockeyroos (women's field hockey);
 the Mighty Roos (ice hockey);
 the Volleyroos (men's volleyball);
 the Australia Davis Cup team (men's tennis);
 the Australia Fed Cup team (women's tennis);
 the Australian national touch football teams;
 the Australia national baseball team in the World Baseball Classic;
 the Sharks (men's field lacrosse);
 the Australia women's national lacrosse team (women's lacrosse);
 the Australia national indoor lacrosse team (box lacrosse);
 Team Australia on UFC The Smashes The Ultimate Fighter: The Smashes
 the Wizards of Aus Australian men's roller derby team
 The Australian Outback Gridiron Team 
 The Australian Powerlifting team

Since 1961, the Wallabies have worn a gold jersey with green lettering and trim; they changed from a primarily green jersey to avoid a colour clash with the Springboks of South Africa.

Companies and organisations
From around 1981 the colours were also used in the livery of the government railway body Australian National, formed by the 1970s merger of Commonwealth Railways with the state-run South Australian Railways and Tasmanian Government Railways. Australian National was privatised in 1997.
Australian Made logo
Australian National Line
Medicare Australia
National Party of Australia

See also

 Australian state colours
 Coat of arms of Australia
 Boxing kangaroo flag

References

Further reading

 Sharpham, Peter (1994) The Origin of the Green and Gold, Sporting Traditions, 1994.
 Australia's National Colours
 Australian National Colours: green and gold
 http://www.smh.com.au/articles/2004/06/11/1086749885653.html?from=storyrhs Newspaper -Sydney Morning Herald 12 June 2004
 http://www.smh.com.au/national/australias-pride-greeted-by-a-sea-of-green-and-gold-20120820-24ipd.html Sydney Morning Herald  21 August 2012
 http://www.australiantimes.co.uk/voices/time-for-australias-green-and-gold-to-shine-in-london.htm  Australian Times
 National Sports Museum July 20, 2012
 Sydney Morning Herald 3 October 2012
 http://www.news.com.au/sport/more-sport/matt-crowdrey-sings-praises-of-australias-swimming-at-london-paralympics/story-fndukor0-1226470993546 September 11, 2012
 Australian Times 24 of January 2012
 Australian Sports Commission funding Green and Gold project 1 March 2012(press release)
 http://www.convictcreations.com/research/symbols.html Symbols of Australia -Defiance and Conformity Retrieved 5 October 2012
 Books Australian National Identity Editor: Justin Healey Print book  Year 2010 -The Spinney Press 

Australia
National symbols of Australia
Rail liveries